Napredak may refer to:
HKD Napredak, cultural society of Croats in Bosnia and Herzegovina
FK Napredak Kruševac, Serbian football club
FK Napredak Aleksinac, Serbian football club
FK Napredak Banatska Topola, Serbian football club
NK SAŠK Napredak, Bosnia and Herzegovina football club
OK Napredak Odžak, Bosnia and Herzegovina volleyball club